Mahanagar@Kolkata is a 2010 Bengali film directed by Suman Mukhopadhyay. The film is based on three stories of Nabarun Bhattacharya. The film was screened in Munich film festivals.

Plot 
Director Suman Mukhopadhyay has strung three stories of Nabarun Bhattacharya Ek Tukro Nyloner Dori, Amar Kono Bhoy Nei Toh and Angshik Chandragrahan to create this film. The story of the film revolves around the people and their life of Kolkata metropolitan city. The film explores the different worlds of Manmatha, Jagadish, Biren, Rohit, Rangili and Kamalini. Manmatha and Jagadish belong to  different economic and social class. Biren is jobless. Rohit is an NRI, Rangili is wife of Rohit. Rohit has a relationship with Kamalini, another woman.

Cast 
 Anjan Dutt as Manmatha
 Sreelekha Mitra as Kamalini
 Arun Mukherjee as Biren
 Chandan Roy Sanyal as Rohit
 Rituparna Sengupta as Rongili

Awards
2009 National Film Awards
 Won - Silver Lotus Award - Best Male Playback Singer - Rupam Islam for the song "Ei To Ami"

References

External links 
 
 

Bengali-language Indian films
2010 films
2010s Bengali-language films
Films set in Kolkata
Films shot in Kolkata
Films directed by Suman Mukhopadhyay